The 2023 season is Young Lion's 20th consecutive season in the top flight of Singapore football and in the S.League.

Squad

Singapore Premier League

U19 Squad
(Singapore Sport School)

Coaching staff

Transfer

In 
Pre-Season

Out

Pre-Season

Mid-Season

Loan In 
Pre-Season

Mid-Season

Loan Return
Pre-Season

Mid-Season

Retained

Friendly

Pre-Season Friendly

Team statistics

Appearances and goals 

Numbers in parentheses denote appearances as substitute.

Competitions

Overview

Singapore Premier League

Singapore Cup

Group

Competition (U21)

Stage 1
All 8 teams will be each other in a round robin format before breaking into 2 groups for another 3 matches.  A total of 10 matches will be played thru the season.

 League table

Stage 2

 League table

See also 
 2017 Garena Young Lions FC season
 2018 Young Lions FC season
 2019 Young Lions FC season
 2020 Young Lions FC season
 2021 Young Lions FC season
 2022 Young Lions FC season

Notes

References 

Young Lions FC
2022
1
Young Lions FC seasons